Israel Matz (February 9, 1869 - February 10, 1950) Matz is well known for founding the Ex-Lax company in 1906, today owned by Novartis. His grandson, Roy M. Goodman, was a New York State Senator from 1969–2002.

Community activity

Israel Matz Institute for Jewish Law
The Israel Matz Institute for Jewish Law at the Faculty of Law of the Hebrew University of Jerusalem, is located on Mount Scopus, in one of the original buildings of the Hebrew University, built in 1925.

Israel Matz Foundation
The Israel Matz Foundation is a non profit organization located in New York City.  The foundation is concerned with aiding indigent Hebrew writers

The Israel Matz Chair of Organic Chemistry
The Israel Matz Chair of Organic Chemistry was established at the Weizmann Institute of Science by the Alice Matz Goodman Endowment Fund, New York, NY, daughter of Israel Matz.

References

1869 births
1950 deaths
People from Kalvarija, Lithuania
Lithuanian Jews
Congress Poland emigrants to the United States
American people of Lithuanian-Jewish descent
American businesspeople